No. 28 Squadron, Indian Air Force, nicknamed The First Supersonics is a squadron of the Indian Air Force (IAF).  It is currently based in Adampur, Punjab with the Western Air Command and flies Mikoyan MiG-29s.

History
The squadron's role is air defence and offence. It is known as "The First Supersonics" because it was the first squadron in the IAF to be equipped with supersonic Mikoyan MiG-21s in 1963.

The squadron was initially based in Chandigarh, Ambala Before 1947 ,later moved to Tezpur, Assam, then Pune, Maharashtra and later to Jamnagar, Gujarat. . They were equipped with MiG 29s in the early 1990s and took part in operations in 2000 in the period of tension between India and Pakistan following the 1999 Kargil War.

Lineage
 Constituted as No. 28 Squadron (First Supersonics) on 23 March 1963

Aircraft

Assignments
Indo-Pak war of 1971

References

028